The Illinois Philharmonic Orchestra (IPO) an orchestra in the Chicago area.   

The Illinois Philharmonic Orchestra is a member of the League of American Orchestras and the Chicago Southland Convention & Visitors Bureau.

External links
http://www.ipomusic.org/ (official web site)

References

Orchestras based in Illinois